Yesterday (stylized as Yesterday...) was a music program aired on TeleRadyo which was hosted by DJ Richard Enriquez. The program was aired every Sundays from 12:00 pm – 3:00 pm, with simulcast on The Filipino Channel worldwide. This program is named after the song from the Beatles of the same name and it is also their theme song of the program. This program plays music of the 1960s, 1970s and the 1980s.

History
Yesterday premiered on July 3, 2010, on DZMM Radyo Patrol 630 and DZMM TeleRadyo. This is DJ Richard's first-ever musical program on AM Radio. It is aired every Saturdays from 1:00 pm – 3:00 pm and Sundays from 12:30 nn – 3:00 pm.

On February 3, 2018, Yesterday aired its final episode on its Saturday edition. It was replaced by the health program Healthy Sabado and an all-OPM music program Songhits: Tunog Pinoy on its timeslot. The latter program is still hosted by the said DJ, but it is running for an hour, until it aired its final episode on November 17, 2018.

On April 5, 2020, Yesterday has moved to an earlier timeslot and extended from 12:00 pm – 4:00 pm due to the COVID-19 pandemic as well as the program's 10th anniversary.

On August 2, 2020, Yesterday has shortened its timeslot from 12:00 pm – 3:00 pm to give way to the early timeslot of Kapamilya Konek. The latter program is hosted by Jing Castañeda and Susan Afan.

On December 27, 2020, Yesterday has aired its final episode after 10 years of broadcasting due to the said DJ leaving the station to return to his original station, DWDM 95.5 FM (which the reformat and rebranding of the station as Eagle FM 95.5 on January 20, 2021), an FM radio station owned by Eagle Broadcasting Corporation, after 11 years as part of its retrenchment program caused by the ABS-CBN shutdown, the Philippine Congress junks the new ABS-CBN legislative franchise to operate and the COVID-19 pandemic in the Philippines. It is replaced by the business program, Bida Konsyumer, and various ABS-CBN current affairs programs on its timeslot.

On January 25, 2021, The program returned and transferred to Eagle FM 95.5 and it was renamed as Yesterday's Classics, at that time, the 90s and 2K hits as well as Easy Listening and Smooth Jazz added to its playlists.

Anchors
DJ Richard Enriquez

About
The show plays your favorite music from the 1960s, 1970s and the 1980s by the radio program host.

The program's format is all about music from DJ Richard from the 60s, 70s and the 80s.

The program sees pictures of Artists while each song is playing.

The radio program host also reads the listeners' text messages via Facebook, or via SMS.

The radio program host also discusses news or flash reports after playing a few songs in the program.

The second part of the program shows more favorite songs from the 60s, 70s and the 80s; and DJ Richard talks about the songs from the radio program.

Trivia
This show and Remember When are the only music programs that air on Sundays.
The Saturday edition of Yesterday was replaced by an all-OPM musical program Songhits: Tunog Pinoy and a health program Healthy Sabado, The latter program is now replaced with a new informative traffic show Usapang Kalye.

See also
TeleRadyo
DZMM
Remember When

References

Philippine radio programs
2010 radio programme debuts
2020 radio programme endings